Croeserw Athletic are a local league football club based in Croeserw, Port Talbot, Wales. The club competes in the Port Talbot Football League, with the first team playing in the Premier Division, and the second team playing in Division One. They are one of the biggest clubs in Port Talbot, with their squad size currently at a high of over 40 players. They play their home games at Tudor Park, which is the highest football pitch in Port Talbot in terms of altitude. They also play league games at the Red Field in Cymmer, the former home of Abercregan United.

History 
Croeserw Athletic were founded in 2010 after branching off Croeserw United after a disagreement between the management, but have been operating since 2006 under Croeserw Juniors after Carl Griffiths felt the village needed a better run club. They won the promotion to the Premier Division of the Port Talbot Football League in 2011, after finishing 2nd in Division 1. They also got to the Semi-final of the Open Cup in the same season. In the opening season, Croeserw Athletic managed to sign 21 players and began to build on a future that brought the community closer to the football club itself.

In 2011, Croeserw Athletic began a programme that would see the Academy fall directly below the senior squads and be fed through the ranks of a First Team & Second Team when they turn to the age of 16. Athletic reordered the biggest sponsorship in Port Talbot Football League history with the biggest Wind Turbine company in Europe sponsoring the whole club for the entire season. The club were now under a single crest (infobox) and wearing the same shirt.

In 2011–12 football season, Athletic saw a rise in players go from 21 senior players to 46 players. They failed to gain entry to the Port Talbot Reserve League with a second team's squad, but were granted entry to the Premier League. This meant that Croeserw Athletic Second Team would have to arrange friendlies with other teams who had gained entry to the Reserve League which proved difficult for all involved. Croeserw Athletic had finished the season at the bottom of the table, with just 6 points and 1 recorded win. In the same year, Croeserw Athletic Under 14's won the League title & Cup, while the under 12's finished Runners-up in the League.

In the 2014/15 season, the management team of Jamie Williams and Peter Robinson took the team to another level, in the first half of the season they comfortably beat a number of the league favourites, including Cwmafan FC, along with local rivals Glyncorrwg FC and Gwynfi United. By Christmas, they were comfortably at the top of the league, however, it was not a position that they would hold.

The following season saw the club win their first piece of silverware, after defeating league champions Cwmafan FC in the 2016 Open Cup final, winning 4–1 in a penalty shootout, after 90 minutes plus extra time in which the game finished 1–1.

In the summer of 2019, over 40 players signed to the club, meaning that the club could now field two teams in the Port Talbot and District Football League once again. Due to the new league format, the two teams were named Croeserw Athletic “A” and Croeserw Athletic “B”, and they were scheduled to face off against each other for the first time in the club's history. The fixture took place on 26 October 2019 at the Red Field, with goals from Curtis Walton and Danny Wilkins ensuring a 2–0 win for Croeserw Athletic “A”. As of February 2020, the league has now split, with the first team competing in the Premier Division, and the second team competing in Division One.

In the 2019–20 season, the club reached the last 16 of the SWFA Senior Cup for the first time. They defeated Star FC and Porth Harlequins before being eliminated by Pentwyn Dynamos.

Playing squad

First team squad

Midway squad

Second team squad

Honours 

• Port Talbot and District Football League Open Cup - 2016

External links 

https://twitter.com/croeserwath2010
https://m.facebook.com/CroeserwAthleticFootballClub/

Football clubs in Wales
2010 establishments in Wales